Daniil Alexeyevich Aldoshkin (born 19 June 2001) is a Russian speed skater.

Personal records

He is currently in 64th position in the adelskalender with 149.192 points.

References

External links

2001 births
Living people
Russian male speed skaters
Speed skaters at the 2022 Winter Olympics
Olympic speed skaters of Russia
Medalists at the 2022 Winter Olympics
Olympic silver medalists for the Russian Olympic Committee athletes
Olympic medalists in short track speed skating
People from Kolomna
Sportspeople from Moscow Oblast